Abbey and West Dereham railway station was a railway station on the line between Downham Market and Stoke Ferry. It served the village of West Dereham and the nearby St Mary's Abbey, in Norfolk, England. It was located south of the village on what is still called Station Road:

History
Opened as Abbey by the Downham and Stoke Ferry Railway on 1 August 1882, the line was run from the beginning by the Great Eastern Railway (GER). The station was renamed twice: on 1 January 1886 it became Abbey for West Dereham; and in 1923 as a result of the Grouping the GER became part of the London and North Eastern Railway and the new owners renamed the station Abbey and West Dereham, this occurring on 1 July 1923. The station closed to passenger traffic on 22 September 1930.

The line became part of the Eastern Region of British Railways on nationalisation in 1948.

Notes

References

External links
 Abbey and West Dereham station on navigable 1946 O. S. map

Former Great Eastern Railway stations
Disused railway stations in Norfolk
Railway stations in Great Britain opened in 1882
Railway stations in Great Britain closed in 1930
1882 establishments in England
1930 disestablishments in England